John Richard Riedling (born August 29, 1975) is a former Major League Baseball pitcher.

Riedling was drafted by the Cincinnati Reds in the 22nd round of the 1994 Major League Baseball Draft. His major league debut occurred on August 30, . Riedling is currently a baseball instructor and has also worked with Expert Village.

External links

Cincinnati Reds players
Florida Marlins players
Major League Baseball pitchers
Baseball players from Fort Lauderdale, Florida
1975 births
Living people
Chattanooga Lookouts players
Indianapolis Indians players
Louisville RiverBats players
Louisville Bats players
Albuquerque Isotopes players
Memphis Redbirds players
Long Island Ducks players